Are You Ready for Freddy? is an album by Freddy Fender. It was released in 1975 on Dot Records and is a collaboration between the singer and producer Huey P. Meaux.

Overview
Of the 12 songs on the record, two were written by Fender, "Cielito Lindo Is My Lady" and "You Came In The Winter Of My Life".  Of the rest, "Lovin' Cajun Style" is a song written by the album's producer.  As well, Fender covers the novelty song "(How Much Is) That Doggie In The Window?", which was originally a Billboard chart-topper for singer Patti Page in 1953. The disc also features a remake of the Ray Charles classic "What'd I Say" and the song "I'm Not Through Loving You Yet", which was co-written by legendary country singer Conway Twitty (a number 3 country hit for Twitty the year prior, which featured on the album of the same name).

Reception
allmusic's Eugene Chadbourne gave the disc high praise (4 stars of a possible 5), and said that Fender "can take on elements as disparate as Doris Day and Ray Charles and make a listener forget either of these icons even exist."  He compared the playing on the record to "an incredibly hip, funky Tex-Mex band hired to play at a wedding."

Track listing
"Secret Love" (Sammy Fain, Paul Francis Webster) 3:38
"Loving Cajun Style" (Huey P. Meaux) 2:21
"Take Your Time" (W.D. Parks) 2:12
"I Can't Put My Arms Around a Memory" (Naomi Martin) 2:32
"Cielito Lindo Is My Lady" (Fender) 3:10
"Begging to You" (Marty Robbins) 2:25
"What'd I Say" (Ray Charles) 3:04
"(How Much Is) That Doggie In The Window?" (Bobby Merrill) 3:05
"Teardrops in My Heart" (Vaughan Horton) 1:58
"You Came in the Winter of My Life" (Fender) 2:26
"I'm Not Through Loving You Yet" (Conway Twitty, L. E. White) 2:26
"Goodbye Clothes" (J. Riley) 3:36

Charts

Weekly charts

Year-end charts

Personnel
Freddy Fender: Electric & Acoustic Guitars, Lead Vocal
Trace Balin: Backing Vocal
Tommy Christian, Randy Cornor, Bill Ham, Robert Martinez, Bobby Neal: Electric & Acoustic Guitars
Larry White: Steel
Red Young: Piano
Ira Wilkes: Bass
Randall Lynch: Drums, Percussion

References 

Freddy Fender albums
1975 albums
Dot Records albums